Ivens François "Toon" Buffett was a political figure from the Australian External Territory of Norfolk Island.

Political offices

He was the Lands Minister and Deputy Chief Minister of Norfolk Island. Previously he had served one term as Chief Executive.

Murder

On 19 July 2004, Buffett was shot dead in his office. 

Buffett's 25-year-old son, Leith, was charged with the murder of his father. Legal proceedings  then found that Leith was  incompetent to stand trial, because of severe mental illness. Leith has been described as believing that his father was "The Evil Prophet". 

Due to the inadequacy of jail cells and hospice facilities on the island, Leith Buffett was transferred to Sydney, first to  Long Bay Prison's hospital, a matter which required an amendment to the Crimes Act 1999 in New South Wales. 

Police stressed that the Buffett case was unrelated to the 2002 death of Janelle Patton who, until Buffett's death, had been the only person in the island's recent history to be murdered there.

Historical note

The popular local politician became the first sitting minister of an Australian government (the island is an external Australian territory) to be assassinated.

See also
 Politics of Norfolk Island

References

Year of birth missing
2004 deaths
2004 in Norfolk Island
Members of the Norfolk Legislative Assembly
People murdered in Norfolk Island
Deaths by firearm in Norfolk Island
Assassinated Australian politicians
Patricides